Bel is a village in Osh Region of Kyrgyzstan. It is part of the Nookat District. Its population was 4,550 in 2021.

Nearby towns and villages include Jiyde (1.3 nm), Jangy-Nookat (5.0 nm) and Chapaev (7.9 nm).

References

Populated places in Osh Region